Cwrt-y-Gollen ("Hazel Court") is a British Army training base, 2 miles (3 km) south-east of Crickhowell and just north of the A40 road and the River Usk, in southeastern Powys, Wales.

History
Cwrt-y-Gollen became the regional centre for infantry training as the Welsh Brigade Depot in 1963. It was announced in 1984 that the depot would close in the interests of economy.

Current use 
Cwrt-y-Gollen training camp is currently used by several services of the British armed forces. Most notably by the British army as a reserve center for B Detachment (North), 203 (Welsh) Field Hospital.

It is also the headquarters for the Gwent and Powys Army Cadet Force (ACF).

References

Villages in Powys
Barracks in Wales
Installations of the British Army